Hendrik Helmke (born 13 July 1987) is a German former professional footballer who played as a midfielder.

Career
Helmke came to Malaysia in 2012 and joined Sabah FA on 16 April 2012, replacing Michael Baird. He scored his first goal for Sabah, converting a penalty in a 2–1 loss against PBDKT T-Team FC on 15 May 2012.

He scored two goals in the Malaysian Super League. The first was in 2–1 loss against PBDKT T-Team FC, the second in a 3–1 victory against Negeri Sembilan FA.

After a spell with the Finnish club Jaro, Helmke joined the Norwegian Tippeligaen side Tromsø on a free transfer in August 2013 and signed a two-and-a-half-year contract with the club. In the winter transfers of 2015, Helmke signed a contract with Esteghlal only to break the deal later for unknown reasons. Later in the same month, he signed a contract for Al Ahly for three-and-a-half years.

References

External links
 
 

1987 births
Living people
People from Harburg (district)
Footballers from Lower Saxony
German footballers
Association football midfielders
Veikkausliiga players
Eliteserien players
Egyptian Premier League players
IFK Mariehamn players
Lüneburger SK players
VfB Lübeck players
Sabah F.C. (Malaysia) players
FF Jaro players
Tromsø IL players
Esteghlal F.C. players
Al Ahly SC players
FC Lahti players
Kokkolan Palloveikot players
German expatriate footballers
Expatriate footballers in Finland
Expatriate footballers in Malaysia
Expatriate footballers in Norway
Expatriate footballers in Iran
Expatriate footballers in Egypt
Expatriate footballers in Saudi Arabia
German expatriate sportspeople in Finland
German expatriate sportspeople in Malaysia
German expatriate sportspeople in Norway
German expatriate sportspeople in Iran
German expatriate sportspeople in Egypt